Mordellistena signaticollis is a species of beetle in the genus Mordellistena of the family Mordellidae. It was described by Quedenfeldt in 1885.

References

External links
Coleoptera. BugGuide.

Beetles described in 1885
signaticollis